Spondylo-meta-epiphyseal dysplasia (SMED) is a rare autosomal-recessive disease that causes skeletal disorders. SMED is thought to be caused by a mutation in the Discoidin Domain Receptor 2 (DDR2) gene.

See also

Spondyloepimetaphyseal dysplasia-short limb-abnormal calcification syndrome

References

External links 

Autosomal recessive disorders
Genetic disorders by system